Religion in West Bengal is composed of diversified beliefs and practices. As per as 2011 census, Hinduism is the largest and biggest religion practiced by native Bengalis in the state, followed by Islam which is the second largest and biggest minority religion in the state. Smaller percentage of people adheres to Christianity, Buddhism, Jainism, Sikhism, Animism, Zoroastrianism & Judaism.

Statistics

History

Hinduism had existed in the region of Bengal before the 20th century BCE and by the third century, Buddhism and Jainism were popular too. Gaur, the first sovereign Hindu kingdom in Bengal with its capital in Karnasubarna in modern-day Murshidabad district, was set up by Shashanka, a Shaivaite king who ruled approximately between 600 AD and 625 AD. The modern structure of Bengali Hindu society was developed during the rule of the Sena dynasty in the 12th century AD. West Bengal has been home to several famous religious teachers, including Sri Chaitanya, Sri Ramakrishna, Rammohan Roy, Swami Vivekananda, A. C. Bhaktivedanta Swami Prabhupada and Paramahansa Yogananda who helped to abolish archaic practices like sati, dowry, and caste-based discrimination or untouchability that crept into the Hindu society during the Middle Ages. But they also played an important role in the resurgence of Hindu nationalism in Bengal. This inherent Hindu identity was the chief factor in Bengali Hindu Homeland Movement which successfully resisted the plan to create a United Bengal and campaigned for the establishing a separate Bengali Hindu homeland within Indian union on the eve of Partition of India in 1947.

The history of West Bengal starts in 1947 with the Partition of Bengal, when the Hindu-dominated western part of British Bengal Province became the Indian state of West Bengal.
When India gained independence in 1947, Bengal was partitioned along religious lines. The western part went to India (and was named West Bengal) while the eastern part joined Pakistan as a province called East Bengal (later renamed East Pakistan, giving rise to independent Bangladesh in 1971).

Buddhism has a rich heritage in Bengal, flourishing during the Pala dynasty (750–1174 CE), but it has roots even earlier, dating to the reign of Emperor Ashoka (r. c.268–232 BCE). Buddhism began to decline from the 12th century when Islam first entered into Bengal region leading to Islamization, and eventually completely disappeared from Bengal. Buddhism has a rich ancient heritage in the various parts of Bengal. The region was a bastion of the ancient Buddhist Mauryan and Palan empires, when the Mahayana and Vajrayana schools flourished. South-Eastern Bengal was ruled by the medieval Buddhist Kingdom of Mrauk U during the 16th and 17th centuries. The British Raj influenced the emergence of modern community. During 12th century, Islam gradually spread and took root throughout the Bengal region, and many Bengali Hindus converted to Islam.

Hinduism

Hinduism is the largest religion of West Bengal with about 71% people responded that they were Hindus during the 2011 Census of India. Out of a total of 91.3 million people in the state, the Hindu population is approximately 65.55 million. Also out of 23 districts in West Bengal, Hindus are in majority in 20 districts and are minority in 3 districts namely- Uttar Dinajpur, Murshidabad and Malda district.

Islam

Islam is the second largest of West Bengal with about 27.01% people responded that they were Muslims during the 2011 Census of India. Out of a total of 91.3 million people in the state, the Muslim population is approximately 24.6 million. Also out of 23 districts in West Bengal, Muslims are in majority in 3 districts and are a minority in 20 districts.

Christianity

Christianity is the third largest of West Bengal with about 0.72% people responded that they were Christians during the 2011 Census of India. Out of total 91.3 million people in the state, the Christian population is approximately 6.6 lakhs. Also out of 23 districts in West Bengal, Christians have a higher concentration in Darjeeling & Jalpaiguri.

Buddhism

Buddhism is the fourth largest of West Bengal with about 0.31% people responded that they were Buddhists during the 2011 Census of India. Out of total 91.3 million people in the state, the Buddhist population is approximately 2.82 lakhs. Also out of 23 districts in West Bengal, Buddhists have a higher concentration in Darjeeling.

Other religions

Sikhism and Jainism have a smaller presence in the state with around 63,523 & 60,141 people follow it respectively comprising 0.07% and 0.06% respectively.

References

 
Culture of West Bengal
History of West Bengal
History of West Bengal (1947–present)
History of Bengal
West Bengal
West Bengal
History of religion in India